Constituency NA-87 (Jhang-II) was a constituency for the National Assembly of Pakistan from 1970 to 2018. It comprised Bhowana Tehsil and some areas of Chiniot and Jhang Tehsils. Upon new delimitation in 2018, this constituency's areas were divided among NA-100, NA-115 and NA-116.

Election 2002 

General elections were held on 10 Oct 2002. Ghulam Bibi Bharwana of PML-Q won by 55,851 votes.

Election 2008 

General elections were held on 18 Feb 2008. Ghulam Bibi Bharwana of PML-Q won by 63,515 votes.

Election 2013 

General elections were held on 11 May 2013. Ghulam Muhammad Lali of PML-N won by 93,651 votes and became the  member of National Assembly.

References

External links
 Election result's official website

NA-087
Abolished National Assembly Constituencies of Pakistan